Parikud is an island in Chilika Lake, Odisha, India.  The land mass is spread over 97 mouzas (administrative districts) of Krushnaprasad panchayat samiti. It is surrounded by Chilika Lake and the Bay of Bengal on two sides. The settlement Jahnikuda is located at the easternmost end of the island and acts as an access point to Puri. The residents of this area primarily work in agriculture and fishing. The current head of the island is Raja Santosh Chandra Deo.

Geography 
Parikud is surrounded by the Bay of Bengal to the southeast and Chilika Lake to the northwest.

History 
Before 1774, Parikud was controlled by the king (Raja) of Bankad (now Banpur). Because Bankara came under attack from the East India Company, Raja of Bankad Sri Harisevak Mansingh went to Parikud and established his capital Nrusinghgarh at Gurubai.

Raja Bhagirathi Mansingh shifted his capital to Krishnaprasad and erected a royal palace in 1798. British forces could not attack Parikud because the region was covered with Chilika Lake. The king donated a village for Brahmins (sasan), which is known as Bhagirathipur Sasan.

When the British invaded Odisha from the south in 1803, the traitor Fateh Muhammed, a ferry owner from Kandakhai (Malud), met them on the shores of Chilika Lake. He showed them the eastern route, by which they reached Puri undetected. In return, Fateh Muhammed was given freehold of Malud and Parikud, most of which is today called Garh Krishnaprasad.

Parikud is located in Krushnaprasad Garh in the Puri district, Odisha. It was founded by Raja Bhagirathi Mansingh, who was the nephew of Maharaja Harisevak. Banpur was previously known as Bankada garh, which was than ruled by the dynasty of the present kings of Parikud, who were attacked by British with the help of Namak Haraam Jagirdar, who helped the British attack the Banpur fort to kill the king and destroy the Banpur fort palace for helping the anti-British Paiko mutiny. The British captured and destroyed the fort of Banpur and killed most of the male members for the royal family of Banpur (now Parikud family) for helping the first Paiko mutiny with horses, equipment and valuables. Most of the members of the family escaped from Banpur with their children but the king was captured and killed. They walked into Gurubai, which was next to Puri, and built their state in Parikud and shifted to protect it from British. The British again tried to enter Parikud through Satpara but were drowned. The government has recovered swords and guns of the British era from the lake.

In 1798, the 16th King Maharaj Bhagirat Manasingh built a comfortable, modern palace with Italian tiles, Belgian glasses and English marble known as Krushnaprasad palace. King George of Greece became the Honourable Guest of the king of Parikud, which upset the British. Rule of the Royal family started without interference over the territory for a long period. The royal state of Parikud extended from Kuhuri to Banpur , Gurubai and Krushna Prasad. The palace is still intact. The Kalijai island is still owned by the royal family of Parikud.

Demographics 
 Indian census, Krishnapra block had a population of 89,371. Males constitute 51% of the population and females 49%. Parikud has an average literacy rate of 72.24%—compared with the national average of 74.04%—with 78% of males and 65% of females literate.

97 mouzas (revenue villages) of Parikud regions are given below.

 Alanda
 Deulapada
 Sanaanla
 Nalitakudi
 Siandi
 Barunakuda
 Harichandanpur
 Gobardhuli
 Talangiri
 Udayagiri
 Jamuna
 Badaanla
 Ipinga
 Naba
 Gopalpur
 Berhumpur
 Balijagannathpur
 Sipia
 Kumarpur
 Talatala
 Tichhini
 Khalamuhan
 Maladeikuda
 Fatepur
 Ora
 Maensa
 Kamalasingh
 Mardarajpur
 Samantarapur
 Rasidgaon
 Chitrakote
 Uthanikuda
 Kalijaipahad
 Adalabad
 Anua
 Parala
 Baripadar
 Kurupal
 Ramalenka
 Kandeswar
 Alanda Patana
 Badadanda
 Nalabana
 Siala
 Nolipatana
 Bhabanipur
 Badajhad
 Patanasi
 Nandala
 Pitisal
 Titipa
 Rasakudi
 Budhibar
 Kanheipur
 Nuapada
 Khirisahi
 Jenapur
 Paikerapur
 Balipatapur
 Baliapokhari
 Nuagaon
 Jagirikuda
 Sahabajpur
 Kumpuri
 Anlakuda
 Mithakuan
 Goursi
 Kadakani
 Hunjan
 Chadheya
 Kandaragaon
 Kholaganja
 Morada
 Gurubai
 Gomundia
 Jharakata
 Malakuda
 Brahmandeo
 Fulabari
 Khatiakudi
 Patharaganja
 Nuagaon
 Janhikuda
 Tubuka
 Patharakata
 Arakhakuda
 Patanasi
 Kalada
 Krushnaprasad
 Maludakhas
 Gilinasi
 Khatisahi
 Santarapur
 Golapur
 Badakuda
 Bajrakote
 Patapur

Climate 

The region is situated in the coastal area with a temperate climate. Rainfall is suitable for agriculture.

Art and culture 

Famous festivals celebrated in Parikud are: 

 Pana Yatra
 Panchudola Yatra
 Dasadola Yatra
 Chandan Yatra
 Raja Parba
 Kartika Purnima
 Dola Purnima
 Makar Sankranti
 Maha Shivaratri
 Durga Puja
 Dussehra
 Diwali

Famous temples in Parikud are:

Baba Jagateswar Temple - Naba
Pandeswar Dev – Titipa
Kamaleswar Dev – Daulapada
Sarveswar Dev – Mahisa
Jhadeswar Dev – Badajharo
Balingaswar Dev – Golopuru
Bateswar Dev – Gomundia
Gopinath Dev – Balisasano
Guteswar Dev- Nuapada
Dadhibaban Dev-Gurubai
Radhakanta Dev- Janhikuda
Nilakantheswar Dev – Krushnaprasad
Dadhibaban Dev – Krushnaprasad
Shree Jagananth Temple – Krushnaprasad
Baba Gadiswar Dev – Krushnaprasad Garh
Maa Badadion Devi – Jagirikuda
Nilakantheswar Dev – Olanda
Bateswar Dev – Moroda
Baba Kanakeswar Dev-Siala
Jagateswar Deva – Siandi
Maa Kanak Durga Devi –Krushnaprasad
Maa Charchika Devi – Nuapada
 Baba Akhandaleswar Dev- Patapur/Gopalpur/Ratamati
 Maa Chandidevi-Patapur
 maa barani devi -jenapura
 Raghunath Dev - Talatala
 Radhakrishna Dev - Talatala
 Gopinath Dev - Nandala

Education 
Colleges in Parukud:
Kandakhai College of Science and Arts, Bajrokote
Kandakhai College of Science and Education, Bajrokote
Rukmunidevi Chilika Mahavidyalaya, Chilika Nuapada
Women's College, Titipa
Govt. ITI College, Gopalpur

Health centres 

There is a primary health center at Chilika Nuapada. There is another health unit near Andhra Bank, Krushnaprasad Garh Branch.

Politics 

Parikud comes under Brahmagiri (Sl. No.: 108), a Vidhan Sabha constituency of Puri district, Odisha. In 2019 election, Bharatiya Janata Party candidate Lalitendu Bidyadhara Mohapatra defeated Biju Janata Dal candidate Sanjay Kumar Das Burma.

Notable residents 

 Mayadhar Mansingh - Odia poet and writer
 Lalit Mansingh - former Indian diplomat, the Foreign Secretary of India
 Sanjay Kumar Das Burma - former MLA, Brahmagiri

See also 

 Chilika lake
 Balugaon
 Banapur

References 

Villages in Puri district
Islands of India
Populated places in India
Islands of the Bay of Bengal